Islamic Jihad for the Liberation of Palestine (IJLP) was a Lebanese Shia group that  claimed credit for the January 24, 1987 abduction of three American and one Indian professors – Alann Steen, Jesse Turner, Robert Polhill, Mithal Eshwar Singh – from Beirut University College in West Beirut.  They were eventually released.

References

Factions in the Lebanese Civil War
Islamist insurgent groups
Jihadist groups in Lebanon
Islamic organisations based in Lebanon
Hezbollah